Étienne Chartier (26 December 1798 – 6 July 1853) was a many faceted Roman Catholic priest from Lower Canada whose family had a long association with anti-British sentiments including supporting the Americans during the siege of Quebec. His political beliefs were made apparent  by his association with the Patriote movement.

External links 
 F.-J. Audet, "L'abbé Étienne Chartier,"(French)
 Biography at the Dictionary of Canadian Biography Online

Lower Canada people
19th-century Canadian Roman Catholic priests
1798 births
1853 deaths